Slip is an upcoming American comedy streaming television series created by Zoe Lister-Jones. It stars Lister-Jones as a woman who travels through parallel universes trying to find her way back to her partner and herself. It will premiere on The Roku Channel.

Premise
Mae Cannon travels through parallel universes trying to find her way back to her partner and herself.

Cast and characters
 Zoe Lister-Jones as Mae Cannon
 Charlene McNabb as Chic Woman
 Emily Hampshire as Sandy
 Whitmer Thomas as Elijah
 Tymika Tafari as Gina
 Amar Chadha-Patel as Eric
 Sofia Galasso as Eva

Episodes

Production

Development
In March 2022, it was announced Zoe Lister-Jones would write and direct a comedy series for The Roku Channel, with Dakota Johnson set to executive produce under her TeaTime Pictures banner.

Casting
Upon the initial announcement, it was announced Zoe Lister-Jones would star in the series. In April 2022, Emily Hampshire, Charlene McNabb, Whitmer Thomas, Tymika Tafari and Amar Chadha-Patel had joined the cast of the series.

Filming
Principal photography began in April 2022 in Toronto.

References

External links
 

English-language television shows
Roku original programming